Caaeteboia is a genus of snakes in the subfamily Dipsadinae of the family Colubridae. The genus is endemic to Brazil.

Species
Caaeteboia amarali (Wettstein, 1930) – Amaral's ground snake
Caaeteboia gaeli Montingelli, Barbo, Pereira Filho, Santana, França, Grazziotin & Zaher, 2020

References

Further reading
Zaher H, Grazziotin FG, Cadle JE, Murphy RW, Moura-Leite JC, Bonatto SL (2009). "Molecular phylogeny of advanced snakes (Serpentes, Caenophidia) with an emphasis on South American Xenodontines: a revised classification and descriptions of new taxa". Papéis Avulsos de Zoologia, Museu de Zoologia da Universidade de São Paulo 49 (11): 115–153. (Caaeteboia, new genus, p. 144). (in English, with an abstract in Portuguese).

Snake genera
Caaeteboia